The Forgotten Battle is a 2020 Dutch World War II film directed by Matthijs van Heijningen Jr. that depicts the Battle of the Scheldt in 1944. The film follows a Dutch Axis soldier played by Gijs Blom, a British glider pilot played by Jamie Flatters, and a resistance woman from Zeeland played by Susan Radder.

Plot
In September 1944, Teuntje Visser works in the office of a collaborationist mayor in German-occupied Zeeland as the Allies approach from Belgium. While she and her father, a doctor, choose to be neutral, her younger brother Dirk is a member of the Dutch Resistance who is arrested for throwing a rock at a German convoy and is tortured into revealing the names of other Resistance members.  

Meanwhile, Marinus van Staveren, a Dutch volunteer in the Waffen-SS Division Das Reich, is reassigned from the Eastern Front to serve as secretary and translator for the German commandant in Zeeland, Oberst Berghof. Marinus grows increasingly disillusioned with the Nazis' heavy-handed tactics including the execution of civilian hostages. He sympathises with Teuntje and her father as they attempt to negotiate a lighter sentence for Dirk in Berghof's office. Despite initial assurances that Dirk will be treated leniently, Berghof ultimately orders that Dirk be executed along with the other Resistance members. Marinus tries to pass the news secretly to Teuntje but is spotted by a German officer who reports him to Berghof. As punishment, he is selected to be part of the firing squad for Dirk's execution and sent back to combat duty.

After Dirk's death, Teuntje is drawn into the Resistance. Teuntje learns that Dirk had been covertly photographing German artillery positions along the Scheldt river. Teuntje steals a tidal map of Sloe Channel from the mayor's office which shows a deep section of the channel that would allow Allied forces to safely cross. She and her best friend, a Resistance member named Janna, are tasked with smuggling Dirk's photographs and the map to the Allied forces advancing on Walcheren island.

Elsewhere, Glider Pilot Regiment Sergeant Will Sinclair, Captain Tony Turner, and Free Dutch Forces soldier Henk Sneijder crash-land in a flooded estuary in Zeeland after their Airspeed Horsa glider is hit by anti-aircraft fire during Operation Market Garden. Turner is wounded during the crash-landing. After wading through the marshes, they shelter at a farmhouse whose owner informs them that Operation Market Garden has failed and that the Canadian Army have entered Holland. They decide to head for the Canadian lines. They take shelter in another house but are abandoned the next day by the other members of their unit. They are then attacked by German soldiers, and Turner is killed. Henk, exhausted and unable to swim, is left behind by Sinclair, who reaches the Allied line and joins Canadian forces advancing on Walcheren island.

Prior to the Battle of Walcheren Causeway, Teuntje is captured while helping Janna escape on a boat with Dirk's photos and the map. Janna is shot and mortally wounded, but makes it to the Allied lines before dying. Marinus takes part in the German defence of Walcheren island while Sinclair participates in the Allied assault. Both sides sustain heavy casualties but the Allied forces ultimately prevail. Marinus deserts the German forces. During the battle, Sinclair and Marinus cross paths but the two men decide to let each other go. 

As the Germans retreat, Marinus kills a German soldier attempting to execute Teuntje but is shot during the struggle. A grateful Teuntje tends to him, but Marinus dies of his injuries. Sinclair and other Allied soldiers find Marinus' body next to Teuntje next to, who walks away as the town is liberated. 

An epilogue mentions that the Allied victory at Walcheren enabled the reopening of the port of Antwerp to Allied forces and helped contribute to the Liberation of the Netherlands on 5 May 1945.

Cast

Production

Development
Matthijs van Heijningen, Jr. directed the film. Alain de Levita, Paula van der Oest, and Mark van Eeuwen served as producers. EO, NPO, Belgian company Caviar joined the project as co-producers. The film received funding from CoBo, Netherlands Film Fund, Flemish Audiovisual Fund, and the Belgian Tax Shelter. It was announced in November 2019 that Netflix would also co-produce, making The Forgotten Battle the company's first Dutch film.

Filming
With a budget of around €14 million, it is the second most expensive Dutch film made after Black Book in 2006. It was shot primarily in Dutch and English with some German.  Principal photography began in Lithuania where a large part of the movie was filmed and continued in the Netherlands and in Belgium. Locations in the Netherlands included Middelburg, Zeeland and the port city of Vlissingen. Some parts of the battle were filmed in and near Limburg, Belgium and in the Sint-Truiden area.

Release
A first trailer was released in November 2020. The film had a premiere in Vlissingen on 14 December 2020. It was originally scheduled for a theatrical release in the Netherlands a few days later, but it was postponed to 5 June 2021. EO broadcast the film on 24 December 2021 and it was streaming on Netflix as of 15 October 2021. The movie ranked in Netflix's all-time top 10 non-English language movies with 60.93 million hours watched in the first 28 days on the platform.

The film finished in third place in the list of best visited films in the Netherlands in 2021 with just over 507,000 visitors. It was the best visited Dutch film on the list, with No Time to Die and Fast & Furious 9 in first and second place respectively. The film won the Platinum Film award for box office success.

Reception
Rotten Tomatoes reported an approval rating of 100% based on 8 reviews with an average score of 8.1/10.

One reviewer said "Do not skip this one! [...]The Forgotten Battle is a tightly wound war film that works"; adding the film covers a World War II conflict "that did not make it to the mainstream conversation". The "Decider" review recommends the film, saying "The Forgotten Battle approaches the scope of a war epic in look and feel while keeping its focus on the disparate trio of individuals at its core, fated to meet in war."

References

External links
 

2020 films
2020 drama films
2020s war adventure films
2020 war drama films
Dutch war drama films
English-language Dutch films
Films postponed due to the COVID-19 pandemic
Films set in 1944
Films shot in Belgium
Films shot in Lithuania
Films shot in the Netherlands
Dutch World War II films
Films about Dutch resistance
World War II films based on actual events